River Road Provincial Park is a provincial park in the Canadian province of Manitoba, designated by the Government of Manitoba in 1997.

The park includes the Captain William Kennedy House, Miss Davis' School/Twin Oaks and the Scott House.

See also
List of protected areas of Manitoba
River Road (St. Andrews, Manitoba)
William Kennedy (explorer)
List of National Historic Sites of Canada in Manitoba
Red River of the North
Red River Colony

References

External links
Find Your Favorite Park: River Road Provincial Park
Historic Sites of Manitoba

Provincial parks of Manitoba
Protected areas of Manitoba